Clinidium veneficum is a species of ground beetle in the subfamily Rhysodinae. It was described by George Lewis in 1888. It is endemic to Japan and is known from Kyushu and Honshu north to Nikkō.

Clinidium veneficum measure  in length.

References

Clinidium
Beetles of Asia
Insects of Japan
Endemic fauna of Japan
Beetles described in 1888
Taxa named by George Lewis (coleopterist)